Unnikrishnan Mukundan (born 22 September 1987), known professionally as Unni Mukundan, is an Indian actor, producer and singer who predominantly works in Malayalam cinema. He has also acted in a few Telugu films.

Unni Mukundan made his acting debut with the Tamil film Seedan (2011), a remake of Nandanam (2002). At the age of 23, after playing several small roles, Unni got his breakthrough with his lead role in Vysakh's action comedy Mallu Singh (2012). Later, he went on to star in several Malayalam films including commercially successful films like Vikramadithyan (2014), KL 10 Patthu (2015), Style (2016), Oru Murai Vanthu Parthaya (2016), Achayans (2017) and Malikappuram (2022). He made his Telugu film debut with the 2016 film Janatha Garage.

Unni Mukundan made his debut as a lyricist and singer with Achayans. He has also sponsored road safety measures by appearing in the motor vehicle department's advertisements.

Early life
Unni Mukundan was born on 22 September 1987 to Malayali parents Madathiparambil Mukundan Nair and Roji Mukundan. He completed his school from Pragati Higher Secondary School at Ahmedabad. He is graduated in English Literature and Journalism from Prajyoti Niketan College, Pudukad.(Thrissur). He was brought up in Ahmedabad, Gujarat. In his early days, he used to work with Motif, now known as TTEC.

Career

Debut and initial success (2011–2013)
In 2011, Unni made his film debut in Tamil film Seedan, a remake of the Malayalam film Nandanam. Unni entered the Malayalam film industry through Bombay March 12 alongside Mammootty, directed by Babu Janardhanan. For his performance in Bombay March 12, he was earned awards as best newcomer from SIIMA, Asianet Film Awards, Asiavision, Jaihind TV, Amrita TV and Vanitha Film Awards. He played a supporting role in Thalsamayam Oru Penkutty, directed by T. K. Rajeev Kumar.

Unni got his turning point from the movie Mallu Singh (2012) directed by Vyshakh. The movie became a huge hit and ran over 100 days. He did cameo appearances in movies Theevram and The Hitlist. In the same year, he appeared in Ezham Suryan and I love Me directed by B. Unnikrishnan. His action sequences where well acclaimed by the audience.

In 2013 he appeared in Ithu Pathiramanal and Orissa, both directed by M. Padmakumar. Also he was seen in D Company an anthology of three independently shot action films.

Breakthrough (2014–present)
In 2014, he appeared in The Last Supper directed by Vinil turned out to be a flop. But in the same year, he made a comeback by playing one of the titular role along with Dulquer Salmaan in super hit movie Vikramadithyan directed by Lal Jose. A critic from Ibtimes wrote "Unni Mukundan has made a massive comeback with this Lal Jose directorial. He nailed his character as Vikraman, a young man with well controlled emotions and realistic attitudes".

In 2015, he was seen in supporting role in the Mammootty starrer Fireman directed by Deepu Karunakaran. Same year, he played the lead role in the movie Samrajyam II: Son of Alexander as Jordan, the son of Alexander who was the protagonist in the prequel. He next release was KL 10 Patthu written and directed by debutant Muhsin Parari.

In 2016, he did action thriller movie Style which turned out to be a decent commercial entertainer. He was then seen in critically acclaimed movie Kaattum Mazhayum and fantasy romantic comedy film Oru Murai Vanthu Parthaya. He made his Tollywood debut with the film Janatha Garage in an antagonistic role as Raghava, son of Sathyam (Mohanlal). The film was both commercial success and critically acclaimed. It was the highest grossing Telugu films of the year.

In 2017 film Achayans, he made his debut as a lyricist and singer. He played one of the lead role along with Jayaram and Adil Ibrahim in the movie and it turned out to be a commercial success. In the same year, he was seen in another multi hero movie Avarude Raavukal along with Asif Ali which received mixed reviews. In August of the same year Clint with director Harikumar was released, in which he played the role of Joseph, father of Edmund Thomas Clint, a child prodigy known for having drawn over 25,000 paintings during his short life of seven years. He was seen in two different looks as a 35-year old and a 73-year-old man in the film. For this film he received Ramu Kariat Movie Award for the Best Actor. His last release of 2017 was Mammootty starrer Masterpiece in which he played the villain role and Tharangam in which he played an extended cameo.

In 2018, he did Tamil-Telugu Bilingual film Bhaagamathie along with Anuskha Shetty which turned out to be both commercial success and critically acclaimed. His next releases were two thriller movies Ira and Chanakyathanthram. Both the films received positive reviews and was commercially successful.

His first release of 2019 was Haneef Adeni's Mikhael, in which he portrayed the role of antagonist Marco Jr. He was seen last in the film Meppadiyan which had a theatrical release on January 14, 2022. He will be also seen in a Telugu film Khiladi.

Production
Unni Mukundan launched his new film production company Unni Mukundan Films (UMF) on 17 August 2020.

Filmography

Malayalam

Other language films

Television

Discography

Awards

References

External links

Living people
Male actors from Kerala
Male actors in Telugu cinema
Male actors in Malayalam cinema
Indian male film actors
Male actors in Tamil cinema
1987 births
21st-century Indian male actors
South Indian International Movie Awards winners
Male actors from Thrissur